Homer C. Rice (born February 20, 1927) is a former American football player, coach, and college athletics administrator. As Director of Athletics at Georgia Tech, Rice successfully developed and implemented the Total Person Program which is now the model for NCAA Life Skills Program that is in place at universities throughout the nation.

Career

Early career
Rice attended Centre College in Danville, Kentucky, where he lettered in both football and baseball. He was a Collier's All-American in football in 1948 and made a lasting impact on the Centre football program, as the team hands out the Homer Rice Award to its special team's most valuable player each season. He was named to the Centre Athletics Hall of Fame in 1992. From 1951 to 1961 Rice coached high school football in Tennessee and Kentucky, compiling a record of 101–9–7. In 1962, Charlie Bradshaw hired Rice to be his offensive coordinator at the University of Kentucky.  He coached the offense at Kentucky for four years, leading the SEC in offense and winning the national passing title. During the 1966 season, he served as offensive coordinator for the University of Oklahoma under head coach Jim Mackenzie.  From 1967 to 1968, he served as the head football coach at the University of Cincinnati, where he compiled an 8–10–1 record. After Rice accepted the head coaching position at the University of Cincinnati, Oklahoma's coach Mackenzie died of a massive heart attack.  Upon Mackenzie's death, Oklahoma's athletic director and the president called Rice to request that he return to replace Mackenzie as head coach at Oklahoma.  Rice had already hired his staff at Cincinnati and turned down the Oklahoma job to stay committed to his staff at Cincinnati.

From 1969 to 1975, he served as the athletic director at the University of North Carolina at Chapel Hill, and from 1976 to 1977, he served as both the athletic director and the head coach at Rice University.  As Rice's head coach, he compiled a 4–18 record.  He was the head coach of the Cincinnati Bengals of the National Football League (NFL) from 1978 to 1979. The air option offense was pioneered by Rice.

Georgia Tech
His longest tenure as an athletic director though came at the Georgia Institute of Technology, where he served from 1980 to 1997, and was inducted into Omicron Delta Kappa. He took a $62,000 a year pay cut to leave the Cincinnati Bengals, despite stiff opposition from Paul Brown who strongly favored Coach Rice staying with the Bengals, in pursuit of fulfilling his life's mission of building an athletic program with the student-athlete Total Person Program as a cornerstone.

Athletic success during Rice's tenure included a 1990 National Championship in football, 1990 Men's Basketball NCAA Final Four, nine consecutive appearances in the NCAA Tournament in basketball, three ACC Tournament Championships in basketball, 18 players selected in the NBA draft, 1994 College Baseball World Series runner-up, 13 consecutive NCAA appearances in baseball, six first-round selections in Major League Baseball draft, 1994 NCAA runner-up in golf, two golfers named Player of Year in the 1990s, three Olympic gold medalists in track and three Olympians in baseball, four top ten finishes in Track and 14 ACC team championships including football (1), baseball (4), basketball (3), golf (5) and volleyball (1).

Head coaching record

College

NFL

Bibliography

References

1927 births
Living people
Cincinnati Bearcats football coaches
Cincinnati Bengals head coaches
Georgia Tech Yellow Jackets athletic directors
Kentucky Wildcats football coaches
North Carolina Tar Heels athletic directors
Oklahoma Sooners football coaches
Rice Owls athletic directors
Rice Owls football coaches
Centre College alumni
High school football coaches in Kentucky
High school football coaches in Tennessee
People from Bellevue, Kentucky